Saad Alfarargi is United Nations Special Rapporteur on the right to development.
He started his task on 1 May 2017.

Education 
Bachelor in Commerce, University Cairo, 1956.
Master of Science in Political Science, University Cairo, 1956.
degree in International Relations, London School of Economics.

Responsibilities

In Egypt 
Assistant to Minister of Foreign Affairs of Egypt;
Chief of the Presidential Bureau for Economic Affairs, Presidency, Cairo
Director General for International Economic Affairs, Ministry of Foreign Affairs, Cairo;
Chief of Cabinet of the Minister of State for Foreign Affairs and Special Political Adviser, Ministry of Foreign Affairs, Cairo;

At the United Nations 
UN Assistant Secretary General (ASG) Assistant Administrator of the UNDP and Regional Director for Arab States, New York
Ambassador, Permanent Representative of Egypt to the UN in Geneva Specialized Agencies and other International Organizations in Switzerland;
Special rapporteur for the United Nations Special Session on Disarmament Expert for the United Nations Disarmament Centre

Activities
 1956—1957		Attaché League of Arab States, Cairo
 1957—1960.		Worked at Ministry of Foreign Affairs, Cairo
 1960—1964		Third secretary Embassy of Egypt, Vienna
 1969—1972		Head of economic section, Ministry of Foreign Affairs, Cairo,
 1972—1973.		chief of cabinet of minister of state
 1973—1977		Counsellor permanent mission of Egypt United Nations, New York City
 1989—1995		Governor Egypt Common Fund for Commodities, Amsterdam               
 1998—2012		Permanent Observer of the League of Arab States to the UN Geneva
   Now			   Editor-in-Chief of the political affairs periodical "Diplomat"

Articles by Saad Alfarargi
Saad Alfarargi has published articles on different subjects including business and security. peace and security, economic development, disarmament and world trade, international order.

References 

Living people
United Nations special rapporteurs
Egyptian officials of the United Nations
1936 births